Samuel Morin (born July 12, 1995) is a Canadian former professional ice hockey defenceman who played for the Philadelphia Flyers of the National Hockey League (NHL). He was selected by the Flyers in the first round, 11th overall, of the 2013 NHL Entry Draft.

Early life
Morin was born on July 12, 1995, in Lac-Beauport, Quebec. His parents, Pascal and Sylvie, were farmers from the Francophone area of Saint-Isidore. Morin began playing minor ice hockey at the age of five, and his parents started a catering business while their son began playing in tournaments. In 2007 and 2008, Morin played in the Quebec International Pee-Wee Hockey Tournament with the Rive-Sud Est minor hockey team. In the 2010–11 season, Morin played for the Lévis Commandeurs of the Quebec Junior AAA Hockey League. In 36 midget "AAA" hockey games there, he recorded 12 assists and 40 penalty minutes.

Playing career

Junior 
In 2011, the Rimouski Océanic of the Quebec Major Junior Hockey League (QMJHL) selected Morin in the first round, seventh overall, of the QMJHL draft. He played left wing for the 2011–12 season, scoring eight points in 62 games with the Océanic, but quickly made the switch to defenceman. He was rewarded for his outstanding first year play by being selected to the 2011–12 QMJHL All-Rookie Team.

On September 17, 2013, Morin signed a three-year, entry-level contract with the Flyers, but was returned to the Océanic to play the 2013–14 season in the QMJHL.

Morin was a member of Canada's gold medal-winning squad at the 2015 World Juniors held in Toronto. That year, he also won the President's Cup with the Océanic as QMJHL champions, but could not advance in the ensuing 2015 Memorial Cup tournament among Canadian Hockey League (CHL) champions.

Professional 
In the closing stages of the 2016–17 NHL season, Morin was recalled by the Flyers from the American Hockey League (AHL)'s Lehigh Valley Phantoms and made his NHL debut against the New Jersey Devils on April 4, 2017.

During the 2018 Calder Cup playoffs in the AHL, Morin suffered a season-ending knee injury. When Morin returned to play in 2019, he re-injured the same knee, tearing his ACL for the second time in 19 months. Due to his back-to-back injuries, he played very few games between 2018 and 2020.

On December 31, 2020, the Flyers announced Morin would be trying out for a left wing position for the 2020–21 season, instead of defense. Morin made his debut at forward on January 30, 2021, against the New York Islanders. He had previously stated he was trying to model his game after Islanders' enforcer Matt Martin.

Morin returned to the Phantoms to play defense in February and March 2021. He was recalled to the Flyers for the March 25 game against the New York Rangers, in which he fought Brendan Lemieux and received a $3,017.24 fine for unsportsmanlike conduct. In the following game, on March 27, Morin scored his first NHL goal on Rangers' goaltender Igor Shesterkin.
His goal was the game-winner to break a four-game losing streak.

On May 3, 2022, Flyers GM Chuck Fletcher announced that Morin’s playing career would be cut short by immense, unrecoverable damage to his knee. Fletcher also said Morin would be offered a job within the organization.

Career statistics

Regular season and playoffs

International

Awards and honours

References

External links
 

1995 births
Living people
Canadian ice hockey defencemen
Ice hockey people from Quebec
Lehigh Valley Phantoms players
National Hockey League first-round draft picks
People from Capitale-Nationale
People from Chaudière-Appalaches
Philadelphia Flyers draft picks
Philadelphia Flyers players
Rimouski Océanic players